The 2016–17 Arizona State Sun Devils men's ice hockey season was the 2nd season of play for the program at the Division I level. The Sun Devils represented Arizona State University and were coached by Greg Powers, in his 8th season.

Season
For the program's second varsity season, the team began by running a gauntlet of ranked teams. As a result, Arizona State's record was very poor to start the season. After a small reprieve in the middle of the year the team ran through another slate of ranked programs to end the season, however, the early-season difficulties appeared to have helped because the Sun Devils were able to win one and tie two matches against such opponents. Because of the team's recent entry into Division I, Arizona State had a difficult time scheduling games at the end of the year and were forced to play a series against a Division II program (Southern New Hampshire) and end the season with two weekends against non-NCAA teams.

Greg Powers did bring in the program's first big recruit in Joey Daccord and, though he did not help much in his freshman season, he would provide a massive boon to the Sun Devils in the near future.

Departures

Recruiting

Roster

As of March 20, 2017.

|}

Standings

Schedule and Results

|-
!colspan=12 style=";" | Regular Season

|-
!colspan=12 style=";" | 

|-
!colspan=12 style=";" | Exhibition

Scoring Statistics

Goaltending statistics

Rankings

*USCHO did not release a poll in week 23.

Players drafted into the NHL

2017 NHL Entry Draft
No Arizona State players were selected in the NHL draft.

References

Arizona State Sun Devils men's ice hockey seasons
Arizona State Sun Devils
Arizona State Sun Devils
2017 in sports in Arizona
2016 in sports in Arizona